Pierre is the capital city of the U.S. state of South Dakota and the seat of Hughes County. The population was 14,091 at the 2020 census, making it the second-least populous US state capital after Montpelier, Vermont. It is South Dakota's ninth-most populous city. Founded in 1880, it was selected as the state capital when the territory was admitted as a state. Pierre is the principal city of the Pierre Micropolitan Statistical Area, which includes all of Hughes and Stanley counties.

History

Pierre was founded in 1880 on the east bank of the Missouri River opposite Fort Pierre, a former trading post that developed as a community. It was designated as the state capital when South Dakota gained statehood on November 2, 1889.

Huron challenged the city to be selected as the capital, but Pierre was selected for its geographic centrality in the state. Fort Pierre had developed earlier, with a permanent settlement since circa 1817 around a fur trading post. Fort Pierre Chouteau, preceding the city, was named after Pierre Chouteau, Jr., an American fur trader from St. Louis, Missouri, who was of colonial French origin.

Pierre's development was also influenced by construction of the Rapid City, Pierre and Eastern Railroad, which runs east–west through the city. It increased access to markets for regional products and improved transportation for passengers. The railroad crosses the Missouri River on the Chicago and North Western Railroad Bridge.

The capital city became relatively isolated in the post-World War II era of federally subsidized highway construction, as travelers and freight companies began to use automobiles and trucking. It is one of four state capitals not served by the Interstate Highway System.

Geography

Pierre is sited on rough river bluffs above the east bank of the Missouri River, overlooking its expanse. It is a few miles away from Lake Oahe, one of the world's largest man-made lakes. Developed for flood control and irrigation, the lake has become a popular fishing destination.

Climate
Pierre has a relatively dry, four-season, humid continental climate (Köppen: Dfa), with long, dry, cold winters, hot summers, and brief spring and autumnal transitions; like much of the southern half of the state, it lies in USDA Plant Hardiness zone 5. According to weather maps and their data, Pierre can be considered a cool semi-arid climate (Köppen: BSk) aided by its precipitation near the threshold that reaches even northeast of the city in South Dakota. As such, it is the only capital of the Midwest states with a non-humid climate. In addition, there are an average 20.9 nights per year with lows below , and cold conditions are often intensified by the Great Plains' high winds. Summers often see spikes in temperature, with 6.6 days of highs above  and 37–38 days with highs above .

On July 23, 1973, an F3 tornado struck Pierre and caused 10 injuries. It was the strongest tornado ever recorded in Hughes County.

The beginnings of May and October see the last and first freezing nights, respectively, of the cooler season. Precipitation is much lighter in the winter than in late spring and summer, and totals about  annually.

Demographics

2010 census

As of the census of 2010, there were 13,646 people, 5,778 households, and 3,463 families living in the city. The racial makeup of the city was 85.1% White, 0.5% African American, 10.9% Native American, 0.6% Asian, 0.5% from other races, and 2.4% from two or more races. Hispanic or Latino people of any race were 1.9% of the population.

There were 5,778 households, of which 29.2% had children under the age of 18 living with them, 45.7% were married couples living together, 10.4% had a female householder with no husband present, 3.8% had a male householder with no wife present, and 40.1% were non-families. 35.0% of all households were made up of individuals, and 11% had someone living alone who was 65 years of age or older. The average household size was 2.23 and the average family size was 2.87.

The median age in the city was 39.3 years. 22.9% of residents were under the age of 18; 7.5% were between the ages of 18 and 24; 26.7% were from 25 to 44; 28.9% were from 45 to 64; and 13.9% were 65 years of age or older. The gender makeup of the city was 47.8% male and 52.2% female.

2000 census

As of the census of 2000, there were 13,876 people, 5,567 households, and 3,574 families living in the city. The population density was 1,065.8 people per square mile (411.5/km2). There were 5,949 housing units at an average density of 457.0 per square mile (176.4/km2). The racial makeup of the city was 88.91% White, 0.20% African American, 8.56% Native American, 0.46% Asian, 0.02% Pacific Islander, 0.29% from other races, and 1.56% from two or more races. Hispanics or Latinos of any race were 1.25% of the population.

There were 5,567 households, out of which 32.9% had children under the age of 18 living with them, 51.6% were married couples living together, 9.5% had a female householder with no husband present, and 35.8% were non-families. 31.5% of all households were made up of individuals, and 10.7% had someone living alone who was 65 years of age or older. The average household size was 2.35, and the average family size was 2.96.

In the city, the population was spread out, with 27.2% under the age of 18, 6.5% from 18 to 24, 28.6% from 25 to 44, 23.6% from 45 to 64, and 14.1% who were 65 years of age or older. The median age was 38 years. For every 100 females, there were 90.5 males. For every 100 females age 18 and over, there were 85.4 males.

As of 2000 the median income for a household in the city was $42,962, and the median income for a family was $52,144. Males had a median income of $32,969 versus $22,865 for females. The per capita income for the city was $20,462. About 5.5% of families and 7.8% of the population were below the poverty line, including 7.9% of those under age 18 and 9.2% of those age 65 or over.

Transportation
Public transit is provided by River Cities Public Transit.

Pierre Regional Airport is served by one commercial airline.

Although in the center of the state, Pierre is one of only four state capitals not served by an Interstate highway (along with Dover, Delaware, Jefferson City, Missouri, and Juneau, Alaska). It is the only one that is not served by any expressways.

The Rapid City, Pierre and Eastern Railroad runs east–west through the city. The railroad crosses the Missouri River on the Chicago and North Western Railroad Bridge.

Education
The Pierre School District oversees three elementary schools, a middle school and a high school, T. F. Riggs High School. St. Joseph, is a private Catholic elementary school. It is administered by the local parish and the Diocese of Sioux Falls. Other schools include For His Glory and the Pierre Indian Learning Center (a tribal school affiliated with the Bureau of Indian Education).

Media

Television

AM radio

FM radio

Newspaper
The Capital Journal is the local newspaper and has been in circulation since 1881. OaheTV is the local public/education/government cable channel serving Pierre, Fort Pierre on Midcontinent Communications Cable.

Notable people
 Angela Aames, actress
 Floyd Bannister, Major League Baseball player
 Joseph Bottum, writer
 Tom Brokaw, television journalist and author
 Robert Gleckler, actor
 Dusty Johnson, U.S. representative from South Dakota (born in Pierre in 1976)
 Byron S. Payne, Attorney General of South Dakota
 John Thune, U.S. senator from South Dakota (born in Pierre in 1961)
 Rex Robbins, actor
 Mike Rounds, U.S. senator from South Dakota and former governor of South Dakota (resident of Fort Pierre).

In popular culture
In 2015, in honor of the 80th anniversary of the "Monopoly" board game, Hasbro held an online vote to determine which cities should be included in an updated version of the "Here and Now: The US Edition" of the game. The top "Boardwalk" spot went to an unexpected contender: Pierre. It received the most votes, beating New York, Los Angeles, Chicago, and Boston. The outcome may have been influenced by the image that accompanied the name of the city in the balloting: the well-known Mount Rushmore, which is 150 miles west of Pierre, in Keystone and the Black Hills section of the state.

Pierre's attractions include the Oahe Dam and its associated lake, popular for recreation such as fishing.

References

External links

 Pierre Chamber of Commerce
 Pierre city government official website
 Rawlins Municipal Library
 River Cities Public Transit

 
Populated places established in 1880
Cities in South Dakota
County seats in South Dakota
Pierre, South Dakota micropolitan area
Cities in Hughes County, South Dakota
South Dakota populated places on the Missouri River
1880 establishments in Dakota Territory